The DoorDash 250 was a NASCAR Craftsman Truck Series race at Sonoma Raceway that ran in 2022. The race has not been confirmed as being placed on the 2023 NASCAR schedule.

The race was previously held during the first four years of the Truck Series (from 1995 to 1998), but was dropped for 1999 as the series' second road course date moved to Portland International Raceway. At the time, the track was known as Sears Point International Raceway and the race was held in October as a standalone race from the Cup Series schedule.

The 2022 race was held June 11, 2022 with Kyle Busch claiming the race victory. The race was held the same weekend as the NASCAR Cup Series' Toyota/Save Mart 350 and the ARCA Menards Series West's General Tire 200.

History

The 2022 Truck Series schedule was released on September 29 with Sonoma on Saturday, June 11. It replaced the race at the Watkins Glen road course, which had been added back on the Truck Series schedule in 2021 for the first time since 2000.

The 2022 race was 75 laps and 149.25 miles in length according to NASCAR.com. Stage 1, won by Ty Majeski, was 20 laps in length. Stage 2, won by Ben Rhodes, was 25 laps in length. The final stage was 30 laps in length.

Past winners

Manufacturer wins

References

External links
 

NASCAR Truck Series races
NASCAR races at Sonoma Raceway
Annual sporting events in the United States
1995 establishments in California
2022 establishments in California